St. Paul's School for Boys is an Episcopal, coed, private school located in Brooklandville, Maryland. It occupies a  rural campus in the Green Spring Valley Historic District, ten miles (16 km) north of the city of Baltimore in suburban Baltimore County.

The school includes a pre-school and a lower school, which are coed through grade 4. The boys school also shares its campus with St. Paul's School for Girls which was reestablished in 1959 after a 19th-century predecessor failed. In July 2018, the schools unified under the umbrella of The St. Paul's Schools, with a single board of trustees and one president; each school retains its individual traditions and its gender-specific programs.

St. Paul's School for Boys was founded in February 1849 at Old St. Paul's Parish in Baltimore City by the Reverend William Edward Wyatt, rector.

St. Paul's moved its campus four times until its final location at the current grounds in 1952. The principal building on the Brooklandville campus is "Brooklandwood," a mansion built in 1793 by Charles Carroll of Carrollton (1737-1832), one of the signers of the Declaration of Independence. The building was listed on the National Register of Historic Places in 1972.

Academics

At the time of the school's founding in the mid-nineteenth century, boys studied Greek, Latin, and math. Church music was also given high priority. Today St. Paul's School for Boys offers a college-preparatory curriculum for students in the Upper School (grades 9–12). The school offers the IB Diploma Program. It also offers courses in theater, concert chorale, digital arts, and visual arts.

Athletics

St. Paul's places a strong emphasis on athletics. Despite the school's small class sizes of roughly 70 students per class year, the school supports varsity teams in lacrosse, football, soccer, volleyball, cross-country, wrestling, basketball, ice hockey, squash, tennis, crew, golf, baseball.

Lacrosse 

Since the start of varsity lacrosse interscholastic competition at St. Paul's in 1933, the Crusaders have won 25 titles in the old Maryland Scholastic Association (MSA) followed by the Maryland Interscholastic Athletic Association (MIAA)  — more than any other team in the conference. St. Paul's claimed its first lacrosse title in the MSA public/private schools league in 1940 under Lacrosse Hall of Fame head coach Howdy Myers. St. Paul's prevailed the next two decades in the MSA, winning the title 14 times.

In 1947, St. Paul's beat Princeton University twice. During this period, St. Paul's posted five undefeated seasons, four under Myers and another in 1951 underJim Adams. The 1969 Crusader team, coached by George Mitchell, went undefeated. The 1992 St. Paul's team also went undefeated, winning a MSA championship under coach Mitch Whiteley. In 2010, St. Paul's won the conference championship, the 25th in school history, under head coach Rick Brocato. St. Paul's has produced 12 C. Markland Kelly Award winners, which honors the top scholastic player in the state of Maryland each year. St. Paul's has also produced 22 high school All-Americans and 21 graduates in the U.S. Lacrosse Hall of Fame.

Basketball 
The inaugural season for Varsity Basketball was 1935 and the program has won 16 championships with 13 coaches. Championships include the  MSA "B" Conference, Baltimore Interacademic League, (IAC), MSA “C”, MSA “A” Conference, and the MIAA B Conference.The most recent championship was in 2016–17. Coach Howdy Myers’ team won the first championship in 1938–39 in the MSA B conference.

Football 
Since varsity football began early at St.Paul's in 1936, the Crusaders have won 20 championships. Mitch Tullai, former varsity football coach, coached at St. Paul's from 1953 to 1993. Over 40 years, Tullai won 11 Championships, including 6 MSA C-Conference Championships, and 5 Tri-County Championships.

Golf
The Varsity Golf team at St. Paul's School currently holds 16 MIAA or MSA championship titles, 8 stroke-play championship titles, 8 individual champions, and 11 All Metro Players. The team's home course is the West Course at Baltimore Country Club. The head coach is Eric Nordstrom with the head emeritus being Rick Collins.

Traditions

Since 1935, the St. Paul's Honor Council has been run by a group of upperclassmen who are elected by the student body.  The council upholds the school's honor code and the principles of the school motto, Veritas et Virtus, truth and virtue. The first alumni association was founded in 1894. Each year, the alumni association plays host to a number of events that bring alums back to campus.

Notable alumni

James 'Ace' Adams '46, lacrosse Hall of Fame inductee and coach; namesake includes Adams Field at UPenn
Scott Bacigalupo, lacrosse player
A. Aubrey Bodine, photographer
Conor Gill, professional lacrosse player
Steve Johnson, professional baseball player; pitcher for the Seattle Mariners
Johnny Mann, Grammy Award-winning composer, conductor, entertainer, and recording artist
Brooks T. Moore '81, narrator for How It's Made
Mark Pellington, director of Arlington Road and music video for the Pearl Jam song "Jeremy"
Richard Sher, newscaster, WJZ-TV Baltimore
LaMonte Wade, baseball player for the San Francisco Giants
Mark Walsh, entrepreneur, venture capitalist, political activist
Michael Watson, professional lacrosse player
Glenn Yarbrough, '48, folk singer, leader singer of the Limeliters from 1959 to 1963
Don Zimmerman, lacrosse coach

References

Further reading
 Hein, David. "The Founding of the Boys' School of St. Paul's Parish, Baltimore." Maryland Historical Magazine 81 (1986): 149–59.
 Hein, David. "Christianity and Honor." The Living Church, August 18, 2013, pp. 8–10.
 Otterbein, Angelo F. We Have Kept the Faith : The First 150 Years of the Boys' School of St. Paul's Parish, 1849-1999. Brooklandville, Md.: St. Paul's School, 1999.

External links
 

Brooklandville, Maryland
Boys' schools in Maryland
Private schools in Baltimore County, Maryland
Educational institutions established in 1849
Private high schools in Maryland
Private middle schools in Maryland
Private elementary schools in Maryland
Episcopal schools in Maryland
1849 establishments in Maryland
Preparatory schools in Maryland
Middle schools in Maryland
High schools in Maryland